Escape sequences are used in the programming languages C and C++, and their design was copied in many other languages such as Java, PHP, C#, etc. An escape sequence is a sequence of characters that does not represent itself when used inside a character or string literal, but is translated into another character or a sequence of characters that may be difficult or impossible to represent directly.

In C, all escape sequences consist of two or more characters, the first of which is the backslash,  (called the "Escape character"); the remaining characters determine the interpretation of the escape sequence. For example,  is an escape sequence that denotes a newline character.

Motivation 
One could attempt to represent the string to be printed as a single literal as follows:

#include <stdio.h>
int main() {
    printf("Hello,
world!");

return 0;
}

This is not valid in C, since a string literal may not span multiple logical source lines. This can be worked around by printing the newline character using its numerical value ( in ASCII),

#include <stdio.h>
int main() {
    printf("Hello,%cworld!", 0x0A);
    return 0;
}

While this will indeed work when the machine uses the ASCII encoding, it will not work on systems that use other encodings, that have a different numerical value for the newline character. It is also not a good solution because it still does not allow to represent a newline character inside a literal, and instead takes advantage of the semantics of printf. In order to solve these problems and ensure maximum portability between systems, C interprets  inside a literal as a newline character, whatever that may be on the target system:

#include <stdio.h>
int main() {
    printf("Hello,\nworld!");
    return 0;
}

In this code, the escape sequence  does not stand for a backslash followed by the letter , because the backslash causes an "escape" from the normal way characters are interpreted by the compiler. After seeing the backslash, the compiler expects another character to complete the escape sequence, and then translates the escape sequence into the bytes it is intended to represent. Thus,  represents a string with an embedded newline, regardless of whether it is used inside  or anywhere else.

This raises the issue of how to represent an actual backslash inside a literal. This is done by using the escape sequence , as seen in the next section.

Some languages don't have escape sequences, for example Pascal. Instead a command including a newline would be used ( includes a newline,  excludes it).
writeln('Hello');
write('world!');

Table of escape sequences
The following escape sequences are defined in standard C. This table also shows the values they map to in ASCII. However, these escape sequences can be used on any system with a C compiler, and may map to different values if the system does not use a character encoding based on ASCII.

Note 1.Common non-standard code; see the Notes section below.
Note 2.There may be one, two, or three octal numerals n present; see the Notes section below.
Note 3.\u takes 4 hexadecimal digits h; see the Notes section below.
Note 4.\U takes 8 hexadecimal digits h; see the Notes section below.

Notes
 produces one byte, despite the fact that the platform may use more than one byte to denote a newline, such as the DOS/Windows CRLF sequence, .

A hex escape sequence must have at least one hex digit following , with no upper bound; it continues for as many hex digits as there are. Thus, for example,  denotes the byte with the numerical value ABCDEF16, followed by the letter , which is not a hex digit. However, if the resulting integer value is too large to fit in a single byte, the actual numerical value assigned is implementation-defined. Most platforms have 8-bit  types, which limits a useful hex escape sequence to two hex digits. However, hex escape sequences longer than two hex digits might be useful inside a wide character or wide string literal(prefixed with L):
char s1[] = "\x12";       // single char with value 0x12 (18 in decimal)
char s1[] = "\x1234";     // single char with implementation-defined value, unless char is long enough
wchar_t s2[] = L"\x1234"; // single wchar_t with value 0x1234, provided wchar_t is long enough (16 bits suffices)

An octal escape sequence consists of  followed by one, two, or three octal digits. The octal escape sequence ends when it either contains three octal digits already, or the next character is not an octal digit. For example,  is a single octal escape sequence denoting a byte with numerical value 9 (11 in octal), rather than the escape sequence  followed by the digit . However,  is the octal escape sequence  followed by the digit . In order to denote the byte with numerical value 1, followed by the digit , one could use , since C automatically concatenates adjacent string literals. Note that some three-digit octal escape sequences may be too large to fit in a single byte; this results in an implementation-defined value for the byte actually produced. The escape sequence  is a commonly used octal escape sequence, which denotes the null character, with value zero.

Non-standard escape sequences
The C standard requires such "invalid" escape sequences to be diagnosed (i.e., the compiler must print an error message). Notwithstanding this fact, some compilers may define additional escape sequences, with implementation-defined semantics. An example is the  escape sequence, which has 1B as the hexadecimal value in ASCII, represents the escape character, and is supported in GCC, clang and tcc. It wasn't however added to the C standard repertoire, because it has no meaningful equivalent in some character sets (such as EBCDIC).

Universal character names
From the C99 standard, C has also supported escape sequences that denote Unicode code points in string literals. Unlike the other escape sequences considered, a universal character name may expand into more than one code unit.

The sequence  denotes the code point , interpreted as a hexadecimal number. The sequence  denotes the code point , interpreted as a hexadecimal number. The code point is converted into a sequence of code units in the encoding of the destination type on the target system. For example (where the encoding is UTF-8, and UTF-16 for ):
char s1[] = "\xC0"; // A single byte with the value 0xC0, not valid UTF-8
char s2[] = "\u00C0"; // Two bytes with values 0xC3, 0x80, the UTF-8 encoding of U+00C0
wchar_t s3[] = L"\xC0"; // A single wchar_t with the value 0x00C0
wchar_t s4[] = L"\u00C0"; // A single wchar_t with the value 0x00C0

A value greater than  may be represented by a single  if the UTF-32 encoding is used, or two if UTF-16 is used.

Importantly, the universal character name  always denotes the character "À", regardless of what kind of string literal it is used in, or the encoding in use. The octal and hex escape sequences always denote certain sequences of numerical values, regardless of encoding. Therefore, universal character names are complementary to octal and hex escape sequences; while octal and hex escape sequences represent code units, universal character names represent code points, which may be thought of as "logical" characters.

See also 
 Escape sequence
 Digraph

References

Further reading 
 ISO/IEC 9899:1999, Programming languages — C
 
 

C (programming language)
Control characters